59 kDa 2'-5'-oligoadenylate synthetase-like protein is an enzyme that in humans is encoded by the OASL gene.

2'-5'-oligoadenylate synthase is a protein family of structurally similar proteins, including OAS1, OAS2, and OAS3. OASL, like the proteins of 2'-5'-oligoadenylate synthase family, is induced by interferons.

See also
 Oasl2, a mouse gene, which is a paralog of mouse gene Oasl1, the ortholog of this gene

References

Further reading